The 1895 Cork Senior Hurling Championship was the ninth staging of the Cork Senior Hurling Championship since its establishment by the Cork County Board in 1887.

Blackrock were the defending champions.

On 3 November 1895, Blackrock won the championship following a 1–02 to 1–01 defeat of Ballyhea in the final. This was their sixth championship title and their third title in succession.

Results

Final

Championship statistics

Miscellaneous

 Blackrock become the first team to win three successive championships.
 Ballyhea qualify for the final for the first time.

References

Cork Senior Hurling Championship
Cork Senior Hurling Championship